Bigfork is a census-designated place (CDP) in Flathead County, Montana, United States. It is within Montana's Rocky Mountains. The population was 4,270 at the 2010 census, up from 1,421 in 2000.

History

Some say the name "Bigfork" is derived from the Salish name for the area. However Bigfork is a fork where two rivers, the Flathead River and the Swan River, flow in to the Flathead Lake. There are reports of a homestead and orchard immediately north of Bigfork as early as 1885. Everit L. Sliter set out 500 apple, cherry, plum, and pear trees in 1892 on Flathead Lake's east shore. He became the first postmaster in 1901. In 1902, he platted the Bigfork townsite at the mouth of the Swan River. The east shore has since become a major cherry-growing area. Wayfarers State Park lies just south of the community.

Geography
Bigfork is located in south-central Flathead County at  (48.065214, -114.081700), at the north end of Flathead Lake. The western edge of the CDP is the Flathead River, the primary inflow of the lake. The Swan River flows into Flathead Lake from the east, entering the lake at the center of town. The CDP extends south to the Lake County line; east to Mud Lake, Mud Creek, and the north-south part of the Swan River; and northwards to the roads north of Echo Lake.

Highway 35 runs through the center of Bigfork and proceeds south along the eastern shore of Flathead Lake, rejoining US 93 at Polson.

Demographics

As of the census of 2010, there were 4,270 people, 652 households, and 410 families residing in the CDP. The population density was 247.1 people per square mile (95.4/km2). There were 962 housing units at an average density of 167.3 per square mile (64.6/km2). The racial makeup of the CDP was 97.33% White, 0.35% African American, 1.06% Native American, 0.35% Asian, 0.14% Pacific Islander, 0.07% from other races, and 0.70% from two or more races. Hispanic or Latino of any race were 1.48% of the population.

There were 652 households, out of which 18.9% had children under the age of 18 living with them, 55.4% were married couples living together, 4.9% had a female householder with no husband present, and 37.0% were non-families. 33.3% of all households were made up of individuals, and 14.4% had someone living alone who was 65 years of age or older. The average household size was 2.08 and the average family size was 2.59.

In the CDP, the population was spread out, with 16.8% under the age of 18, 5.7% from 18 to 24, 18.2% from 25 to 44, 30.9% from 45 to 64, and 28.4% who were 65 years of age or older. The median age was 50 years. For every 100 females there were 91.8 males. For every 100 females age 18 and over, there were 85.8 males.

The median income for a household in the CDP was $36,116, and the median income for a family was $50,288. Males had a median income of $36,313 versus $23,542 for females. The per capita income for the CDP was $20,314. About 7.6% of families and 9.1% of the population were below the poverty line, including 10.0% of those under age 18 and 13.1% of those age 65 or over.

Education
Bigfork School District educates students from kindergarten to 12th grade. Bigfork High School is home to the Vikings and Valkyries.

Bigfork has a public library, a branch of the Flathead County Library.

Arts and culture
Located on a bay of Flathead Lake, Bigfork boasts an array of tourist activities for every season. The town is home to a 27-hole golf course, art galleries, and live theatre. Visitors can rent boats or take a chartered tour of the lake. Nearby Jewel Basin offers hiking. Glacier National Park and the Bob Marshall Wilderness are only a short drive away. Bigfork Summer Playhouse offers Broadway-caliber productions every summer. Bigfork is also home to the Bigfork Independent Film Festival (BIFF) which is held in the fall. BIFF is where Montana-made films are shown and Montana filmmakers are recognized and awarded.

Notable people
 Dirk Benedict, actor, author, director
 Jack Hanna, zookeeper
 Lon Hinkle, professional golfer
 Bill Lindsay, former NHL forward
 Maury Povich, TV personality, publisher of Flathead Beacon
 J. K. Simmons, actor, worked at the Bigfork Summer Playhouse

See also

 List of census-designated places in Montana

References

External links

 Bigfork Eagle Newspaper
 Chamber of Commerce

Census-designated places in Flathead County, Montana